Middle East Review of International Affairs (MERIA) was a quarterly, peer-reviewed, journal on Middle East issues founded by the late Barry Rubin and edited by Dr. Jonathan Spyer. The journal is no longer active; the last published issue was Vol. 21, No. 3 (Fall/Winter 2017). MERIA was published by the Rubin Center for Research in International Affairs formerly known as Global Research in International Affairs Center (GLORIA) of the Interdisciplinary Center (IDC) in Herzliya, Israel.

The Rubin Center for Research in International Affairs also published MERIA News, a monthly magazine on Middle East studies; MERIA Research Guides; and MERIABooks, collections of articles from the journal and other sources.  According to Rubin's website for MERIA, the mission of the publication is "to advance research on the Middle East and [to] foster scholarly communication and cooperation," and MERIA is a "non-partisan publication involving people across the geographical and political spectrum."

References

External links 
Rubin Center for Research in International Affairs – Organization website
Middle East Review of International Affairs (MERIA) – Journal website

Political magazines published in Israel